Emerald Valley is the second studio album by American band Filthy Friends. It was released on May 3, 2019 under the Kill Rock Stars label.

Critical reception

Track listing

Charts

References

2019 albums
Filthy Friends albums
Kill Rock Stars albums